The 1946 Swarthmore Quakers football team was an American football team that represented Swarthmore College as an independent during the 1946 college football season. In its fifth, non-consecutive year under head coach Lew Elverson, Swarthmore compiled a 5–3 record and was outscored by a total of 129 to 70.

The team played its home games at Alumni Field in Swarthmore, Pennsylvania.

Schedule

References

Swarthmore
Swarthmore Garnet Tide football seasons
Swarthmore Garnet Tide football